Quercus gilva, the red-bark oak, is a species of tree in the beech family Fagaceae. It has been found in Japan, Korea, and southeastern China (Fujian, Guangdong, Guizhou, Hunan, Taiwan, Zhejiang). It is placed in subgenus Cerris, section Cyclobalanopsis.

References

External links
line drawings, Flora of China Illustrations vol. 4, fig. 394, drawings 11 + 12 at upper right 

Flora of China
Plants described in 1923
gilva
Trees of Japan
Trees of Korea